The Ultimate Surfer is an American television surfing competition show that aired on ABC from August 23 to September 21, 2021. In March 2022, the series was canceled after one season.

Format
The Ultimate Surfer, an eight-episode series, gathers some of the world's best amateur surfers to live and train together as they battle it out on the consistent and perfect waves created at the "Surf Ranch" in Lemoore, California. The contestants compete in team and individual challenges, focusing on specific elements of surfing, such as, barrels, cutbacks, turns, and front and back-side surfing where they will compete for the highest score by the judges. 

Weekly eliminations will leave two men and two women as finalists. They can either form alliances or rivalries by sending their fellow surfers into a "surf-off", where they must surf at nighttime to get the best score to move on in the competition.

The winner's prize is $100,000 and an opportunity to compete on the WSL Championship Tour, the pinnacle of professional surfing, as well as earn the title of "The Ultimate Surfer".

Production
On November 13, 2019, it was announced that ABC had ordered the series, with Kelly Slater as special correspondent. Craig Piligian, Erik Logan and Dana White served as executive producers. On April 7, 2021, it was announced that the series would premiere on August 16, 2021, later being rescheduled to August 23, 2021. On May 6, 2021, it was announced that Jesse Palmer would host the show, with Erin Coscarelli and Joe Turpel serving as commentators.

On March 30, 2022, it was announced that the series has been cancelled after one season.

Surfers
The surfers were revealed on May 6, 2021.

Contestant progress

Key
 The contestant won the competition.
 The contestant came in second place in the competition.
 The contestant won the surfing competition with their partner.
 The contestant was nominated to surf in the surf off.
 The contestant was eliminated in the surf off.
 The contestant won their way back into the competition.
 The contestant failed to return back into the competition.

Episodes

Reception

Notes

See also

The Ultimate Fighter

References

External links
 
 

2020s American reality television series
2021 American television series debuts
2021 American television series endings
American Broadcasting Company original programming
English-language television shows
Sports entertainment
Surfing competitions
Surfing mass media
Television shows filmed in California
World Surf League